XHSN-FM is a radio station on 106.7 FM in Nogales, Sonora, Mexico. The station is owned by Grupo Radiorama as Studio wih a English/Spanish classic hits format.

History
XHSN received its concession on October 28, 1994. It was owned by Radiorama, which leased it to Larsa when Radiorama shed many of its stations in Sonora.

In 2019, XHSN flipped to romantic under new ISA management.

This station reverted to Radiorama control, until January 1, 2022

References

Radio stations in Sonora
Radio stations established in 1994
1994 establishments in Mexico